Matyáš Vágner (born 5 February 2003) is Czech professional footballer who plays as a goalkeeper for FC Sellier & Bellot Vlašim on loan from Slavia Prague.

Career
Vágner made his professional debut in a 2–0 UEFA Europa League win against Rangers on 18 March 2021. He came on as a substitute in the 60th minute, as the starting goalkeeper Ondřej Kolář left the game following a life-threatening foul of Kemar Roofe resulting in a fractured skull and 10 stitches.

Honours

 SK Slavia Prague
Czech First League: 2020–21
Czech Cup: 2020–21

References

External links
 
 Fotbal.cz Profile
 Idnes.cz Profile
 SN Profile

2003 births
Living people
Footballers from Prague
Czech footballers
Czech Republic youth international footballers
SK Slavia Prague players
Association football goalkeepers